Jules Boucherit (29 March 1877 – 1 April 1962) was a French violinist and renowned violin pedagogue.

Jules Boucherit was born in Morlaix. He attended the Conservatoire de Paris, studying under Jules Garcin. Later he taught at the same conservatoire; notable students include Serge Blanc, Janine Andrade, Ginette Neveu, Manuel Rosenthal, Henri Temianka, Manuel Quiroga, Ivry Gitlis, Michel Schwalbé, Devy Erlih, Michèle Auclair and Marcel Chailley, who became Boucherit's assistant.

He played with pianist Louis Diémer, with his sister, pianist and composer Magdeleine Boucherit Le Faure, and later with Magda Tagliaferro between 1910 and 1922. He made several 78rpm recordings.

Boucherit married his pupil Denise Soriano (1916–2006). He died in 1962 in Paris.

Les Secrets du Violon: Souvenirs de Jules Boucherit (1877–1962) by Jules Boucherit  / 9782867420450 Publisher Editions des Cendres

References

External links
History of Notable French Artists
About Jules Boucherit at Yad Vashem website

20th-century French male classical violinists
French music educators
1877 births
1962 deaths
People from Morlaix
Violin pedagogues
Conservatoire de Paris alumni
French Righteous Among the Nations